André Schulze (born 21 November 1974) is a German former road racing cyclist, who competed as a professional between 2001 and 2013.

Palmarès

References

External links 

1974 births
Living people
German male cyclists
People from Görlitz
Presidential Cycling Tour of Turkey stage winners
Cyclists from Saxony
People from Bezirk Dresden